Survivor NZ: Nicaragua is the first season of Survivor NZ, a television series based on the popular reality game show Survivor. The series was announced in February 2016, and premiered on TVNZ 2 on 7 May 2017. The season was filmed in Nicaragua, the same location as four seasons of the American edition of Survivor: Nicaragua, Redemption Island, San Juan del Sur and Worlds Apart.

The sixteen contestants were initially separated into two tribes, named Hermosa and Mogotón. When ten players remained, they merged into one tribe, named Casar. Avi Duckor-Jones won the season and was named the Sole Survivor. Matai'a Salatielu "Sala" Tiatia was voted the Gem People's Choice Award.

Contestants

Season summary
Sixteen castaways arrived in Nicaragua and were divided into two tribes of eight: Mogotón and Hermosa. Immediately, both tribes were informed that they would each vote out a player that same day with no opportunity to earn immunity. Following the double elimination, Redemption Island was introduced, giving previously eliminated players another chance to return to the game. Hermosa fared better in challenges, and Mogotón's woes continued with a surprise medical evacuation. Afterwards, tribes were shuffled with the former Hermosa members in the majority on both tribes. Nate and Barb blindsided Georgia on Hermosa, and Tom betrayed his former Mogotón members to side with the Hermosa men and eliminate his rival Shay on Mogotón.

Shay returned to the game after defeating Georgia in the final pre-merge duel, and the tribes merged. The former Hermosa members maintained a majority over Mogotón, but loyalties were in question due to the tribal shuffle. Nate, Barb, Avi and Sala brought in Shannon and counted on Tom to rejoin his old Mogotón players, due to their being down in numbers. The alliance of five quickly took out Lee and Mike, but briefly fell apart after Barb organized a blindside of Sala, the most liked player in the game.

After Sala's blindside, Tom realized he needed to realign with Avi, and they proved to be the most powerful duo in the game (rivaling Nate and Barb). Nate was eliminated at the final four after Barb won a crucial immunity. In spite of both Mike and Nate winning their way back from Redemption Island at the end of the competition, Avi, Tom and Barb remained strong to the end, with Barb saying all along that her mission in the game was to get one of them to win. When the three finalists faced the jury, Barb was grilled for being lazy and accused of not playing for almost half of the game. Tom had many allies on the jury but Avi's stronger argument (highlighting Tom staying in the game due to Avi saving him) earned him the title of Sole Survivor by a vote of 6-1-0.

Episodes

Voting history

References

External links
Official website

New Zealand 1
2017 New Zealand television seasons
Television shows filmed in Nicaragua